Discography for Sérgio Mendes.

Discography

Albums
1961: Dance Moderno (Philips)
1962: Cannonball's Bossa Nova (Riverside/Capitol Records)
1962: Do the Bossa Nova with Herbie Mann, Latin Fever with Herbie Mann
1963: Você Ainda Não Ouviu Nada! (a.k.a., The Beat of Brazil) (Philips)
1964: The Swinger From Rio (a.k.a., Bossa Nova York) (Atlantic)
1965: In Person at El Matador (Atlantic)
1965: Brasil '65  (a.k.a. In The Brazilian Bag) (Capitol)
1966: The Great Arrival (Atlantic)
1966: Herb Alpert Presents: Sergio Mendes & Brasil '66 (A&M)
1967: Equinox (A&M)
1967: Quiet Nights (Philips)
1967: The Beat of Brazil (Atlantic)
1968: Look Around (A&M)
1968: Fool on the Hill (A&M)
1968: Sergio Mendes' Favorite Things (Atlantic)
1969: Crystal Illusions (A&M)
1969: Ye-Me-Lê (A&M)
1970: Edu Lobo: Sergio Mendes Presents Lobo (A&M)
1970: Live at the Expo (A&M)
1970: Stillness (A&M)
1971: País Tropical (A&M)
1972: Four Sider (A&M, double compilation album)
1972: Primal Roots (a.k.a., Raízes - Brazil) (A&M)
1973: In Concert (A&M)
1973: Love Music (Bell)
1974: Vintage 74 (Bell)
1975: Sérgio Mendes (a.k.a., I Believe - Brazil) (Elektra)
1976: Homecooking (Elektra)
1977: Sergio Mendes and the New Brasil '77 (Elektra)
1977: Pelé (Atlantic)
1978: Brasil '88 (Elektra)
1979: Alegria (a.k.a., Horizonte Aberto - Brazil) (WEA)
1979: Magic Lady (Elektra)
1983: Sérgio Mendes (A&M)
1984: Confetti (A&M)
1986: Brasil '86 (A&M)
1989: Arara (A&M)
1992: Brasileiro (Elektra)
1996: Oceano (Verve)
2006: Timeless (Concord)
2008: Encanto (Concord)
2010: Bom Tempo (Concord)
2014: Magic (Okeh)
2020: In the Key of Joy (Concord)

Singles

External links

"Sérgio Mendes."  The Brazilian Sound: Brazil's Music & Culture, 13 July 2008.

Discography
Discographies of Brazilian artists
Bossa nova discographies